Daluwatte Hewa Buddhika Kurukularatne  (19 June 1943 – 9 June 2021) (known as Buddhika Kurukularatne) was a journalist, author, lawyer, and Sri Lankan politician. He served as representative of Galle District for the United National Party in the Parliament of Sri Lanka.

Early life
Buddhika Kurukularatne was born on 19 June 1943 to a well known family in Ambalangoda, he was the only child of Daluwatte Hewa Henry de Silva Kurukularatne and Manana Hewa Senehelatha Piyaseli of Duwa in Ambalangoda. Kurukularatne had his early education at Maha Ambalangoda Methodist School, Dharmasoka Primary School and St. Thomas' School Bandarawela. Later, he received his secondary education from Dharmasoka College and St. Thomas' College, Guruthalawa.

Journalist career
In 1965 Kurukularatne served as a grade 1 journalist in editorial staff of Sun (English Daily) and in 1966 editorial staff of The Observer (English Daily). Then he served from 1966 to 1970 in the editorial staff of Virakesari and Janata (Sinhala Daily). There he was in  charge of the foreign news page. As freelance columnist he wrote articles on regular basis for weekly Sunday English and Sinhala newspapers on his experiences as a parliamentarian in lighter vein and was widely read and acclaimed by both government and opposition Sri Lankan parliamentarians. Kurukularatne authored 6 books, 2 in English, 'Student Days 1', 'Student Days down Memory Lane and four books in Sinhala which have been approved by the Sri Lanka Ministry of Education as 'Readers'.

References

External links
 Book Reviews: "Student Days" 

1943 births
2021 deaths
Sri Lankan Buddhists
Sri Lankan journalists
Sinhalese writers
Sri Lankan non-fiction writers
Sinhalese lawyers
United National Party politicians
Members of the 9th Parliament of Sri Lanka
Alumni of Dharmasoka College
People from Ambalangoda